Susanna (Shushanik) Amatuni (February 28, 1924, Yerevan - March 20, 2010, Yerevan) was a Soviet Armenian art critic, musicologist, Dr. of Arts (1988), professor (1997), Honored Teacher of the USSR(1966).

Biography
Susanna (Shushanik) Babken Amatuni was born in 1924 in Yerevan, Armenia. In 1943 she graduated from Shirak State University in Leninakan, Armenia, Physics and Math Department and in 1944 Kara-Murza Music College in Leninakan. She studied in Gnesin Music and Pedagogy Institute, Theory and Composition Department which was considered the hardest one there. In 1951 she returned to Armenia and until 1968 taught theoretical subjects at Chaikovsky Music School, Yerevan. In 1961 she was invited to teach in Komitas State Conservatory of Yerevan where she devised her own unique method and taught a special course of Music Analysis for the Theory Department. In addition to this subject S.B. Amatuni taught Piano Teaching Method and other courses.
In 1988 she was honored Doctor of Arts for her monograph "Arno Babajanian. Instrumental Compositions".

Works
Prof. Amatuni is the author of over 50 scientific articles. She participated in numerous scientific conferences in different cities of the USSR: Moscow, Leningrad, Tbilisi, Yerevan. She is the author of various works such as «Arno Babajanian. Instrumental Works», «Geghuni Chitchian's Life and Works» (Yerevan, 2003), textbooks «Music Literature for 6-th grade of Music School»,«Music Literature for 7-th grade of Music School» (1st and 2nd edition), a series of brochures. Her scientific research includes analysis of melodic and stylistic peculiarities of works of Sayat-Nova, Komitas, Arno Babajanian, Anushavan Ter-Ghevondyan, Haro Stepanyan, Geghuni Chitchian and other composers.

References

Sources
 Ով ով է. Հայեր. Կենսագրական հանրագիտարան, հատոր առաջին, Երևան, 2005.

1924 births
2010 deaths
Soviet Armenians